Wonder of the Worlds Sesh Heri, published 2005 by Lost Continent Library, is the first in a trilogy of novels featuring secret agent Harry Houdini facing off against a Martian invasion in the late 19th and early 20th centuries.

Plot introduction
In the first installment, Wonder of the Worlds, Nikola Tesla, Mark Twain and Houdini pursue Martian agents who have stolen a powerful crystal from Tesla at the historically pivotal 1893 Columbia Exposition in Chicago. Along for the ride aboard Tesla's airship are other historical figures, reporters Lillie West and George Ade, as well as Kolman Czito, Tesla's assistant. On the journey to the Red Planet, the adventurers are treated to a hidden history of conflict between the Earth and Mars, as well as Tesla's stunning knowledge of geophysics of the two planets. Upon arrival on Mars, the team pursues the crystal deep into the underground civilization ruled by Kel, the mad emperor determined to subjugate Earth with the power of the crystal.

Houdini the Spy?
Almost a year after publication of Wonder of the Worlds, the 2006 release of The Secret Life of Houdini: The Making of America's First Superhero by William Kalush and Larry Sloman, presents biographical material supporting the theory that Harry Houdini was, indeed, a secret government agent during the years this trilogy takes place.

Publication

Wonder of the Worlds By Sesh Heri contains illustrations by the author.

Trilogy
The Wonder of the Worlds trilogy continues in Metamorphosis and The Lost Pleaid.

Wonder of the Worlds was featured at the International Tesla Exhibit in Zurich, Switzerland in 2006.

See also
 Nikola Tesla in popular culture
 Mark Twain in popular culture

References

External links
 Official website
 Video of author's discussion of the book

2005 novels
Alternate history novels
Novels set on Mars
Cultural depictions of Mark Twain
Fiction set in 1893